Ralph Joseph Birkofer (November 5, 1908 – March 16, 1971) was an American Major League Baseball pitcher for the Pittsburgh Pirates and Brooklyn Dodgers. His two main pitches were a sinking fastball and a curve.

References

External links

1908 births
1971 deaths
Major League Baseball pitchers
Brooklyn Dodgers players
Pittsburgh Pirates players
Cedar Rapids Bunnies players
Burlington Bees players
Des Moines Demons players
Quincy Indians players
Kansas City Blues (baseball) players
Toronto Maple Leafs (International League) players
Toledo Mud Hens players
Nashville Vols players
Portland Beavers players
Tulsa Oilers (baseball) players
Baseball players from Cincinnati